GLIMPSE is a 5-year project to investigate the controls on thinning at the margin of the Greenland Ice Sheet.  It is based in the Glaciology Group at the School of the Environment and Society, Swansea University.  The project is headed by Professor Tavi Murray and is funded through a Leverhulme Trust Research Leadership Award presented to Murray in mid-2007.

Rationale
Southern Greenland's margins and outlet glaciers are thinning at a dramatic rate, and this rate appears to be accelerating. These changes will have profound implications for global sea levels, ocean circulation, regional climate, and society. The acceleration in the rate of thinning represents more than simply melting, and coincides with major changes in the dynamics of outlet glaciers (e.g. Rignot & Kanagaratnam 2006). The ice sheet models we use to predict sea level rise do not include outlet glacier dynamic processes, and consequently underestimate Greenland's sea level contribution (Alley et al. 2005). Moreover, our available records of thickness changes are not long enough to be sure whether they represent profound alterations in the ice sheet's behaviour or simply expected natural variability. GLIMPSE is building a world-leading and multi-disciplinary group in Swansea which collaborates with international experts to address these deficiencies.  This research will place the known volume change observations in a longer temporal context, identify controls on outlet glacier dynamics, and incorporate these controls within ice sheet models. The key result will be better predictions of the future extent and behaviour of the Greenland ice sheet and therefore of future sea level rise.

Project members
At its peak GLIMPSE will consist of 5 post-doctoral researchers and 3 postgraduate researchers.  Currently the project consists of: 
Professor Tavi Murray, Principal Investigator
Dr Timothy James, Project Manager and postdoctoral researcher
Dr Kilian Scharrer, Postdoctoral Researcher
Dr Anna Hughes, Postdoctoral Researcher
Dr Adam Booth, Postdoctoral Researcher
Dr Suzanne Bevan, Postdoctoral Researcher
Nick Selmes, Postgraduate Research Student
Sue Cook, Postgraduate Research Student
Jonathan McGovern, Postgraduate Research Student
Laura Cordero Llana, Postgraduate Research Student

Project partners include:
Dr Ian Rutt, Swansea University, UK
Dr Adrian Luckman, Swansea University, UK
William Krabill, NASA, Cryospheric Sciences Branch, USA
Dr Matt King, Newcastle University, UK
Dr Tollý Aðalgeirsdóttir, DMI, Denmark

References
 Rignot E, Kanagaratnam P, 2006, Changes in the velocity structure of the Greenland ice sheet, Science, 311(5763), 986–990.
 Alley RB et al. Ice-sheet and sea-level changes, Science, 310 (5747): 456-460 OCT 21 2005.

External links
 GLIMPSE Project website
 Swansea Glaciology
 Swansea University
 The Leverhulme Trust

Environment of Greenland
Glaciology
Arctic research
Swansea University
21st century in the Arctic